Robert Villemain (January 10, 1924 in Paris, France - September 4, 1984 in Montfermeil, France ) was a French boxer. Villemain defeated Hall of Famers Kid Gavilán and Jake LaMotta during his career. He lost his Pennsylvania middleweight title to Sugar Ray Robinson in 1950.

References

External links
 "Robert Villemain", at BoxRec.com

1924 births
1984 deaths
Boxers from Paris
French male boxers
Middleweight boxers